Kfar Szold (lit. Szold Village) is a kibbutz in northern Israel. Located in the Hula Valley in the Galilee Panhandle, it falls under the jurisdiction of Upper Galilee Regional Council.

History
Kfar Szold was founded in the early 1940s by Jewish immigrants from Hungary, Austria and Germany and was named after Henrietta Szold, who founded Hadassah, the Women's Zionist organization. During World War II, she helped rescue children in the Holocaust and transported them to Mandate Palestine, including places such as Kfar Szold.

On 9 January 1948, about 200 Arabs crossed the Syrian border and attacked the kibbutz in reprisal for the Haganah attack on the nearby Palestinian village of al-Khisas a few weeks before. The British Army joined forces with the Jewish defenders, using artillery fire and killing 25 of the attackers.

Prior to the Six-Day War in 1967, Kfar Szold had been a constant target for the Syrian artillery position on the Golan Heights.

On 21 July 2006, Katyusha rockets fired by Hezbollah from Lebanon struck a number of agricultural communities in the Hula Valley, including Kfar Szold. The attacks resulted in a number of injuries.

Economy
The main agricultural products of the kibbutz are apples, citrus fruits, avocados, corn, watermelons and cattle. Alongside agriculture, the kibbutz operates the metal factory Lordan, specialized in heat- and fluid-conducting instruments.

Like many kibbutzim, Kfar Szold has a guesthouse for travelers. The kibbutz also has a sculpture garden.

Since the kibbutz went a process of privatization, several local businesses and services are provided by members.

References

1942 establishments in Mandatory Palestine
Austrian-Jewish culture in Israel
German-Jewish culture in Israel
Hungarian-Jewish culture in Israel
Kibbutzim
Populated places established in 1942
Populated places in Northern District (Israel)